Manitou Springs Bridges are historic bridges are located on Park and Canon Avenues over Fountain Creek in Manitou Springs, Colorado. The bridges are on the National Register of Historic Places.

The Canon Avenue Bridge was built of Manitou greenstone in 1906. Also built of greenstone, the Park Avenue bridge was built in 1907.

See also
 Manitou Springs Historic District
 List of Manitou Springs Historic District buildings

References

Road bridges on the National Register of Historic Places in Colorado
Colorado State Register of Historic Properties
Manitou Springs, Colorado
National Register of Historic Places in El Paso County, Colorado
Stone arch bridges in the United States
Transportation buildings and structures in El Paso County, Colorado